Story Time is a satirical young adult novel by Edward Bloor about the state of education in the United States.

Plot summary

When the school district of Whittaker Magnet School expands to cover Kate and George's duplex, they are forced to go to the frightening school, which is suspected to house a demon. But when the First Lady comes to visit the school, the vengeful demon causes more deaths and accidents. It's up to Kate and George to stop them. The cast of characters includes the spoiled Swiss milkmaid incarnation Heidi, her doting mother Cornelia, her brother Whit, Kate's not-so-secret unwanted admirer, who touches Kate inappropriately, and Pogo, a librarian who can only speak in nursery rhymes.

Reviews
Carlie Webber of Teenreads.com gave the book a positive review, saying that "Fans of Edward Bloor's quirky settings, self-sufficient characters and strange-but-nearly-possible conspiracies will find this story enjoyable and thought provoking."

References

See also

 Tangerine

2001 American novels